RU-22930 is a nonsteroidal antiandrogen (NSAA) related to the NSAAs flutamide and nilutamide (RU-23908) and was developed by Roussel Uclaf but was never marketed. It is a selective antagonist of the androgen receptor and consequently has progonadotropic effects by increasing gonadotropin and testosterone levels via disinhibition of the hypothalamic-pituitary-gonadal axis. Unlike flutamide and nilutamide, the drug is said to be short-acting and inactive by injection, but it has been found to be active topically in animals, and hence could be useful for the treatment of androgen-dependent skin conditions.

See also
 RU-58642
 RU-58841

References

Abandoned drugs
Nitro compounds
Nonsteroidal antiandrogens
Trifluoromethyl compounds